Truth Seekers is a 2020 British supernatural comedy horror streaming television series created by Nick Frost, Simon Pegg, James Serafinowicz, and Nat Saunders. The series was directed by Jim Field Smith and stars Nick Frost and Simon Pegg, with Emma D'Arcy, Samson Kayo, Julian Barratt, Susan Wokoma, and Malcolm McDowell in supporting roles.

The first two episodes premiered at the Canneseries Festival, on 10 October 2020, followed by an Amazon Prime Video release on 30 October 2020.

On 11 February 2021, Frost announced via his Instagram page that the show had been cancelled.

Cast 
 Nick Frost as Gus Roberts: A broadband installer for Smyle internet. He has an interest in paranormal investigations, and Frost described his character as someone "lost and looking for some truth in many aspects of his life."
 Emma D'Arcy as Astrid: A young woman haunted by several ghosts.
 Samson Kayo as Elton John: Gus' new partner at Smyle and in paranormal investigations. Running themes are nobody reacting to his name, his previous experiences at a variety of random jobs, and his ability to unwittingly discover secret passages.
 Malcolm McDowell as Richard: Gus' aging father-in-law.
 Simon Pegg as David: Gus' boss and the head of the broadband company Smyle.
 Susie Wokoma as Helen: Elton's sister, an agoraphobic and anxious cosplayer.
 Julian Barratt as Dr. Peter Toynbee
 Rosalie Craig as Emily Roberts: Gus' wife who died ten years prior to the start of the series.
 Kelly Macdonald as Jojo74
 Taj Atwal as Elara:  Toynbee's devoted assistant, so much so that she sacrifices her life to further his plans.
 Mike Beckingham as Bjorn
 Jon Rumney as Doctor Connelly
 Ranjit Krishnamma as Terry

Premise 
Gus Roberts is the number one engineer at Smyle, Britain's biggest mobile network operator and Internet service provider. In his spare time he's also a keen investigator of the paranormal. Gus is initially disappointed when his boss David partners him up with new recruit Elton John, but the two rapidly form a friendship, working together both professionally and in the paranormal, however Elton is less enthusiastic than Gus in this area. They are joined by Astrid, a young woman who is chased through a house and later a hospital by several ghosts. She escapes the hospital and runs through the countryside before meeting Gus and Elton. Also introduced are Elton's agoraphobic sister Helen, a nervous cosplayer, and Gus' grumpy father-in-law Richard.

Episodes

Development 
In January 2018, it was announced that Stolen Picture was developing their first television project Truth Seekers, a half-hour comedy-horror series about a three-person paranormal investigation team. In August 2019, Amazon Prime Video signed a full series order on Truth Seekers. The series starred Simon Pegg and Nick Frost, alongside Emma D'Arcy, Samson Kayo, Malcolm McDowell, Susie Wokoma, and Julian Barratt. Jim Field Smith directed all 8 episodes of the first season. On 19 October 2020, executive producer and Stolen Picture CEO Miles Ketley passed away 11 days before the series premiere.

Release

Streaming 
On 23 July 2020, during San Diego Comic-Con@Home, the first trailer was released.

The first two episodes premiered at the CannesSeries Festival, on 10 October 2020, followed by a 30 October 2020 wide release on Amazon Prime Video. The series was canceled by Prime Video in February 2021.

Critical reception 
On Rotten Tomatoes, the series has an approval rating of 76% based on reviews from 38 critics, with an average rating of 6.89/10. The website's critics consensus reads, "It may not be as laugh-out-loud funny as Nick Frost and Simon Pegg's previous collaborations, but Truth Seekers is genuinely eerie, balancing out its silly sensibilities with creeping terror and a scary talented cast." On Metacritic, the series has a weighted average score of 60 out of 100 based on reviews from ten critics, indicating "mixed or average reviews".

References

External links 
 

2020 British television series debuts
2020 British television series endings
2020s British comedy television series
2020s British horror television series
Amazon Prime Video original programming
English-language television shows
Television about magic
Television series about ghosts
Television series by Sony Pictures Television
Television series set in 2020
Television series set in the 1860s
Television shows filmed in England
Television shows set in England